St. Ladislaus High School was a coeducational Catholic high school in Hamtramck, Michigan.  It opened in 1921 and was run by the Sisters of St. Francis (Sylvania, Ohio).  The school closed in 1981

Notable alumni
John Paciorek (1964), Former MLB player
Tom Paciorek (1965), Former MLB player
Doug Konieczny (1969), Former MLB pitcher

References

Private high schools in Michigan
Defunct Catholic secondary schools in Michigan